This is a list Australian film directors.

A

 Henry and Aaron
 Sunny Abberton
 Shane Abbess
 Dominic Allen
 Richard James Allen
 Louise Alston
 Stephen Amis
 Mario Andreacchio
 Luke Anthony
 Neil Armfield
 Gillian Armstrong
 Eddie Arya
 Oscar Asche
 Daniel Askill
 Igor Auzins
 Phillip Avalon
 Violeta Ayala
 Tony Ayres

Back to top

B

 Bill Bain
 Franklyn Barrett
 Shirley Barrett
 Luke Bakhuizen
 Ian Barry
 Adam Bayliss
 Bill Bennett
 George Beranger
 Bruce Beresford
 Dean Bertram
 Matt Bird
 Wayne Blair
 Jamie Blanks
 Ruth Borgobello
 Terry Bourke
 Robert Braiden
 Kenneth Brampton
 Gil Brealey
 Ben Briand
 Sue Brooks
 Philip Brophy
 Amanda Brotchie
 Noah brothers
 Spierig brothers
 Nigel Buesst
 Charli Burrowes
 Tim Burstall
 Peter Butt

Back to top

C

 David Caesar
 Ken Cameron
 Serhat Caradee
 A. J. Carter
 Pauline Chan
 David Charles
 Charles Chauvel
 Nathan Christoffel
 Robert Chuter
 Ernie Clark
 Alan Clay
 Genevieve Clay
 James Clayden
 Jub Clerc
 Graeme Clifford
 Peter Clifton
 Edward Irham Cole
 Bob Connolly
 Robert Connolly
 Kenneth Cook
 John Cornell
 Peter Cornwell
 John Cosgrove
 Amiel Courtin-Wilson
 Tom Cowan
 Paul Cox
 Emma-Kate Croghan
 Donald Crombie
 Paul Currie

Back to top

D

 Hattie Dalton
 Roy Darling
 Jonathan Dawson
 Rob Dickson
 Ross Dimsey
 John Dingwall
 Khoa Do
 Jerzy Domaradzki
 Andrew Dominik
 Elissa Down
 Christopher Doyle
 Matt Drummond
 John Duigan
 Peter Duncan

Back to top

E

 Gary Eck
 Nash Edgerton
 Colin Eggleston
 Nabil Elderkin
 David Elfick
 Stephan Elliott
 Bob Ellis
 Luke Eve

Back to top

F

 Martin Fabinyi
 Peter Faiman
 Dan Fallshaw
 Alby Falzon
 John Farrow
 Don Featherstone
 Paul Fenech
 David Field
 Richard Flanagan
 Claude Flemming
 Brendan Fletcher
 Abe Forsythe
 Richard Frankland
 Richard Franklin
 Glenn Fraser
 Alex Frayne
 William Freshman

Back to top

G

 Kieran Galvin
 John Gavin
 Matthew George
 Craig Gillespie
 Clay Glen
 Alister Grierson
 Timothy Grucza

Back to top

H

 Ben Hackworth
 Russell Hagg
 Ken G. Hall
 Ken Hannam
 Brian Hannant
 Brady Haran
 Sandy Harbutt
 Rod Hardy
 Mark Hartley
 A. R. Harwood
 Gerald M. Hayle
 Rolf de Heer
 Trudy Hellier
 Jon Hewitt
 John Heyer
 Scott Hicks
 Arthur Higgins
 Zak Hilditch
 John Hillcoat
 Lyndall Hobbs
 P. J. Hogan
 Cecil Holmes
 Janine Hosking
 Kate Howarde
 Frank Howson
 Patrick Hughes

Back to top

I

 Stephen M. Irwin

Back to top

J

 Clayton Jacobson
 Tom Jeffrey
 Steve Jodrell
 Mark Joffe
 Gregor Jordan
 Kimberley Joseph

Back to top

K

 Nik Kacevski
 Pip Karmel
 Rupert Kathner
 Brian Kavanagh
 Stavros Kazantzidis
 Haydn Keenan
 Alex Kelly
 Chris Kennedy
 Jo Kennedy
 Christopher Kenworthy
 Peter Kirk
 Ana Kokkinos
 Daniel Krige
 Justin Kurzel

Back to top

L

 Craig Lahiff
 John D. Lamond
 Andrew Lancaster
 Devon John Landau
 Samantha Lang
 Clara Law
 Ben Lawrence
 Denny Lawrence
 Ray Lawrence
 Mark Lee
 Julia Leigh
 Don Levy
 Ben Lewin
 W. J. Lincoln
 J. A. Lipman
 Raymond Longford
 Jai Love
 Richard Lowenstein
 Baz Luhrmann
 Robert Luketic
 Lian Lunson
 Lottie Lyell

Back to top

M

 Dan Macarthur
 Charles MacMahon
 Garnet Mae
 Giorgio Mangiamele
 Anthony Maras
 J. E. Mathews
 Claire McCarthy
 T. O. McCreadie
 Paulette McDonagh
 Francine McDougall
 J. P. McGowan
 Neil McGregor
 Luke McKay
 Jackie McKimmie
 Dee McLachlan
 Greg McLean
 Don McLennan
 James McTeigue
 Gaston Mervale
 Jonathan Messer
 David Michôd
 George Miller
 George T. Miller
 Anthony Mir
 Roger Mirams
 Tracey Moffatt
 Noel Monkman
 Jocelyn Moorhouse
 Philippe Mora
 Judy Morris
 Kris Moyes
 Russell Mulcahy
 Maurice Murphy
 Mervyn Murphy
 Scott Murray
 Bruce Myles

Back to top

N

 Arch Nicholson
 Chris Noonan
 Cherie Nowlan
 Phillip Noyce

Back to top

O

 Michael Offer
 George Ogilvie
 Morgan O'Neill
 Chris Owen

Back to top

P

 Martyn Park
 David Parker
 Puven Pather
 Scott Patterson
 Michael Pattinson
 Karen Pearlman
 Rachel Perkins
 David Perry
 Dein Perry
 Michael Petroni
 John Polson
 John Power
 Ian Pringle
 Andrew Prowse
 Alex Proyas
 Leah Purcell

Back to top

Q

 Ken Quinnell

Back to top

R

 Peter Rasmussen
 Gregory J. Read
 Oscar Redding
 Kimble Rendall
 Cloudy Rhodes
 James Ricketson
 Lee Robinson
 Melanie Rodriga
 Tony Rogers
 Alfred Rolfe
 Daniel Ross
 Michael James Rowland
 Richard Roxburgh
 Paramita Roy
 John Ruane
 Michael Rubbo
 Michael Rymer

Back to top

S

 Sinem Saban
 Henri Safran
 David Sander
 Tony Sarre
 Mark Savage
 Matthew Saville
 Lucien Savron
 Fred Schepisi
 Roger Scholes
 Carl Schultz
 Dean Semler
 Ivan Sen
 Yahoo Serious
 Anupam Sharma
 Jim Sharman
 Don Sharp
 Jan Sharp
 Frank Shields
 Cate Shortland
 Jeremy Sims
 Rob Sitch
 Tim Slade
 Beaumont Smith
 Kathy Smith
 John V. Soto
 Harry Southwell
 Macario De Souza
 Rohan Spong
 Kriv Stenders
 Brett Sullivan
 Peter Sykes
 Brian Syron
 Partho Sen-Gupta
 Antony Szeto

Back to top

T

 Simon Target
 Nadia Tass
 John Tatoulis
 Enzo Tedeschi
 Jonathan Teplitzky
 Murali K. Thalluri
 Andrew Thatcher
 Albie Thoms
 Michael Thornhill
 Warwick Thornton
 F. W. Thring
 Judd Tilyard
 Alkinos Tsilimidos
 Sophia Turkiewicz
 Ann Turner
 Jessica M. Thompson
Back to top

U

 Andrew Upton
 Victor Upton-Brown

Back to top

V

 David Vadiveloo
 Karl von Möller

Back to top

W

 Stephen Wallace
 James Wan
 Sarah Watt
 Dunstan Webb
 Christopher Weekes
 Peter Weir
 Eddie White
 Georgina Willis
 George Willoughby
 Simon Wincer
 Paul Winkler
 Richard Wolstencroft
 Kate Woods
 Rowan Woods
 Geoffrey Wright

Back to top

Y

 Aden Young
 George Young

Back to top

Z

 Karl Zwicky

Back to top

See also
 Cinema of Australia

 
film director
Australian film-related lists